Rajshahi City Corporation ( - in short: RCC) is the self-governing corporation that is associated with the task of running the affairs of Rajshahi city. It is one of the major divisional city corporations of Bangladesh. The incorporated area was divided into several wards. Each ward has an elected ward commissioner. The mayor of the city is elected by popular vote every five years. The next election is announced to be held on 2023.

Rajshahi City Corporation is renowned for its success in reducing of high concentrations of small particulates (PM10 and PM2.5) and air pollution.

History
Rajshahi City Corporation was established as the Rajshahi Municipality (Rampur-Boalia Municipality) on August 1, 1876. A town committee of 7 members led by a former principal of Rajshahi College was formed by the Government headquartered in Rajshahi College. Most of the members were later replaced by the elected members. Only the tax-payers could attend the election. The administrator and the Medical Officer were also among the members of the committee. Beside this committee, there was also a Municipal Board. In 1884, the committee was expanded to 21 according to the 3rd rule of Bengal Municipality act 1884. In 1921, the headquarter was shifted to the Municipality Building established near Sona Dighi, Rajshahi. In 1930, 8 municipal committees were formed. The members of the councils were elected by vote for one year. Each committee had separate functions, such as public sanitation and health, public safety, welfare, education and water supply. It gained status as the Rajshahi Municipality Corporation on August 13, 1987, and later renamed as Rajshahi City Corporation.

Administration
Rajshahi City Corporation consists of 30 wards and 4 thanas such as, Boalia, Motihar, Rajpara and Shah Makhdum.

Services 
The Rajshahi City Corporation is responsible for administering and providing basic infrastructure to the city.
 Evict illegal installations.
 Purify and supply water.
 Treat and dispose of contaminated water and sewage.
 Eliminate waterlogging.
 Garbage removal and street cleaning.
 To manage solid waste.
 To arrange hospital and dispensary.
 Construction and maintenance of roads.
 Installation of electric street lights.
 Establish car parking.
 Maintenance parks and playground.
 Maintenance of cemeteries and crematoriums.
 Preparation of birth and death registration certificate.
 Preserving the traditional place.
 Disease control, immunization.
 Establishment of city corporation schools and colleges.

Mayor and Administrator
Former Rajshahi City Corporation mayor and administrator's list:

Elections

Election Result 2018

Election Result 2013

Functions
 City health department
 Engineering department (Water supply)
 Engineering department (Power supply)
 Tax department
 Conservancy department

References

 
City Corporations of Bangladesh
Rajshahi